Matías Gallegos Panozzo (born 15 May 1997) is an Argentine professional footballer who plays as a forward for Unión Santa Fe.

Career
He played for Tiro Federal de Santa Ana and Deportivo Santa Ana in his youth career, before joining Unión Santa Fe in 2011. Seven years later, Gallegos' senior career got underway with Unión Santa Fe. After being promoted into the first-team midway through the 2017–18 Primera División season, Gallegos scored on his professional debut on 31 March 2018. He featured for the final eleven minutes and netted the club's only goal in a 1–1 draw against San Martín. Five further appearances followed in all competitions in season one. In January 2019, Gallegos was loaned to Olimpo of Primera B Nacional.

Gallegos scored four goals for Olimpo, including a brace over Mitre on 24 March 2019. In the succeeding July, having returned to his parent club, Gallegos left on loan for a second time as he returned to the second tier with Estudiantes. He made his debut on 24 August against San Martín, the same opponents he'd score his only Estudiantes goal for in February 2020. Upon returning to Unión, the forward suffered a knee injury. In February 2021, Gallegos joined Chacarita Juniors on a one-year loan deal.

Career statistics
.

References

External links

1997 births
Living people
People from General Obligado Department
Argentine footballers
Association football forwards
Argentine Primera División players
Primera Nacional players
Unión de Santa Fe footballers
Olimpo footballers
Estudiantes de Buenos Aires footballers
Sportspeople from Santa Fe Province